Nightcrawler is 2014 American thriller film written and directed by Dan Gilroy. The film stars Jake Gyllenhaal as Lou Bloom, a stringer who records violent events late at night in Los Angeles, and sells the footage to a local television news station. Rene Russo, Riz Ahmed, and Bill Paxton feature in supporting roles. The film premiered at the 2014 Toronto International Film Festival on September 5, before receiving a theatrical release on October 31, distributed by Open Road Films. Nightcrawler earned a worldwide total of $50.3 million on a production budget of $8.5 million. Rotten Tomatoes, a review aggregator, surveyed 232 reviews and judged 95 percent to be positive.

Nightcrawler received awards and nominations in a variety of categories, with particular praise for Gilroy's screenplay and Gyllenhaal's performance. At the 87th Academy Awards, Gilroy was nominated for an Academy Award for Best Original Screenplay. The film received an additional four nominations at the 68th British Academy Film Awards, three nominations at the 20th Critics' Choice Awards, one nomination at the 72nd Golden Globe Awards, and one nomination at 21st Screen Actors Guild Awards, but did not win any of them. Nightcrawler did fare better at award ceremonies held by critics' organizations, particularly the 19th San Diego Film Critics Society Awards, where it won seven out of its nine nominations. These included Best Actor, Best Director, and Best Film. The American Film Institute and the National Board of Review included Nightcrawler in their lists of top ten films of the year.

Accolades

See also
 2014 in film

References

External links
 

Nightcrawler